Ryszard Wieczorek (born 25 January 1962) is a Polish football manager and former player who played as a midfielder. He is currently in charge of Polonia Bytom.

Wieczorek played for Naprzód Syrynia, Górnik Pszów, Odra Wodzisław and Preussen TV Werl.

He graduated from the Warsaw Coaching School, and has previously managed Limanovia Limanowa and Wisła Puławy. He also coached Korona Kielce from 2004 until he was succeeded by Arkadiusz Kaliszan.

Wieczorek was appointed coach of Odra Wodzisław in June 2018, before moving onto KKS 1925 Kalisz a year later, winning promotion with them in 2020. He was dismissed on 19 October 2021.

References

External links
Ryszard Wieczorek at Soccerway

1962 births
Living people
People from Wodzisław Śląski
Sportspeople from Silesian Voivodeship
Polish footballers
Odra Wodzisław Śląski players
Association football midfielders
Polish expatriate footballers
Expatriate footballers in Germany
Polish expatriate sportspeople in Germany
Polish football managers
Odra Wodzisław Śląski managers
Korona Kielce managers
Piast Gliwice managers
Górnik Zabrze managers
Legionovia Legionowo managers
Polonia Bytom managers
Ekstraklasa managers
I liga managers
II liga managers